Broadcast Enterprises and Affiliated Media, Inc. (BEAM) is a telecommunications company in the Philippines with primary focus on UHF broadcasting and digital terrestrial television for the convergence of multimedia. It is owned by Bethlehem Holdings, Inc., a media investment company of Globe Telecom through its Retirement Fund group.

The frequency currently used by BEAM (channel UHF 31 of Manila and its provincial outlets) had been previously used by Radio Mindanao Network (under the affiliates, CTV-31 (Cinema Television) and E! Philippines) from October 31, 1993, to June 1, 2003, prior to the acquisition by BHI/Globe in 2009.

History
BEAM was established in 1993 by the Canoy family, owners of Radio Mindanao Network. Its Congressional broadcast franchise was granted in 1995. At that time, it only owned one FM radio station in Dagupan.

In 2009, Bethlehem Holdings Inc., an investment firm of the Globe Telecom Retirement Group Fund, acquired BEAM from the Canoys (coinciding with the acquisition of a large stake in another broadcast firm, Altimax, from Mel Velarde).

Throughout the 2010s, BEAM began transitioning its analog channels in key cities nationwide to digital broadcast via ISDB-T. Aside from blocktimers, BEAM is now looking for local and foreign partnerships to allocate and generate content up to seven digital free TV channels.

On July 30, 2020, President Rodrigo Duterte signed by Republic Act No. 11482 An act renewing for another twenty-five (25) years the Franchise Granted to Broadcast Enterprises and Affiliated Media, Inc. Under Republic Act No. 8098 To Construct, Install, Establish, Operate, and Maintain radio and television broadcasting stations in the Philippines.

Stations

Television

Analog terrestrial
* Note: Effective January 1, 2022, all BEAM TV Analog stations permanently ceased its transmission as its fully migrated in digital broadcast format.

Digital terrestrial

Digital subchannels

BEAM TV's nationwide digital broadcast is multiplexed into the following subchannels:

Inactive stations

Programming

See also
 Ayala Corporation
 Globe Telecom
 Altimax
 Kroma Entertainment

References

External links
 Broadcast Enterprises and Affiliated Media, Inc. on KBP
 NOW Corporation

Television networks in the Philippines
Mass media companies of the Philippines
Globe Telecom subsidiaries
Companies based in Mandaluyong